The 20th Guards Berlin twice Red Banner Rocket Brigade (Military Unit Number 92088) is a tactical ballistic missile formation of the Russian Ground Forces. The brigade is located in the city of Spassk-Dalny or Ussuriysk of Primorsky Krai.

The brigade was established in 1964 and is part of the 5th Combined Arms Army of the Eastern Military District.

References

20
Military units and formations established in 1964